Parindra (Parindra) was the name used by two Indonesian political parties.

Pre-war party

Establishment and early years

The first Parindra was established at a congress in Solo from 24-26 December 1935 as a result of a merger between the Budi Utomo political society and the Indonesian National Union (Perserikatan Bangsa Indonesia) with the aim of working with the Dutch to secure Indonesian independence, grouping it with the "cooperative" nationalist organizations. The party's aims were:
 to reinforce the spirit of the unity of the Indonesian people
 to conduct political activities in order to obtain full political rights in a system of government based on democracy and nationalism
 to improve the people's economic and social welfare
The party was led by Soetomo, who was elected at the 1935 congress. Other senior figures included Mohammad Husni Thamrin, Susanto Tirtoprodjo, Sukarjo Wiryopranoto and Woerjaningrat. The party became the most influential Indonesian grouping in the Volksraad, the notionally legislative body established by the Dutch. In the  1935 election, it won two seats in the body, with a further party member appointed directly.

Over the course of 1936, Parindra held a series of public meetings to convey its aspirations to the people. By the end of the year, it had 3,425 members and 57 branches. At its first congress, held in Batavia from 15-18 May 1937, the party claimed to be neither cooperative nor non-cooperative, although its willingness to participate in the Volksraad meant it was in fact cooperative. It pledged to obtain as many seats as possible in the various councils. Two motions were passed, firstly the urge the government to improve the national shipping service and train Indonesians to be sailors, and secondly to set up as many party branches as possible. A second party congress, held in Bandung from 24-27 December 1938 elected Woerjaningrat as leader to replace Soetomo, who had recently died. The party also decided to allow members of the Peranakan ethnic group to join the party. It also passed motions calling for a reduction in unemployment, more spending on public works and a reduction in laborers' working hours.

Youth wing and Nazi salute
Parindra had a youth 'scout organization', Surya Wirawan, which used a version of Roman salute, similar to the Nazi salute, with the arm in a straight line. As early as 1937, members began using this salute, which was called groot saluut, saluut terhormat or great salute. Newspaper articles from the period 1935-42 remarked on Parindra’s bizarre practice, but it was only officially banned in 1941, as colonial authorities became increasingly uneasy about the prospects of a Japanese invasion. In 1941, Mohammad Husni Thamrin died, five days after he was put under house arrest by the Dutch colonial authorities. As Jan Anne Jonkmann, president of the Volksraad from 1939 until 1942, put it in his memoirs: “Thamrin was buried like a prince. The interest and sympathy of the Indonesians were overwhelming.” During his burial ceremony, with a militaristic style, Soekardjo Wirjopranoto – an influential Parindrist, march through Surya Wirawan youths performing the salute. Although Parindra maintained that the party “did not adopt [the salute] out of a particular sympathy for Hitler and his Nazis.”

Final years and banning
In the  1939, four Parindra members were elected to the Volksraad, but none were appointed. In May 1939, Thamrin was the main driving force behind the merger of Parindra and seven other nationalist organizations into the Federation of Indonesian Political Parties (Gaboengan Politek Indonesia, GAPI). The party planned to hold its third congress in Banjarmasin, but it was cancelled following the German invasion of the Netherlands. On 10 January 1942, Japan invaded and subsequently occupied the Dutch East Indies. On 20 March, the Japanese authorities ordered all political parties to be dissolved and banned political activity.

Post-independence party
The second Parindra was established as a "splinter party" in November 1949 by one of the leaders of the pre-war party, R.P. Soeroso, who subsequently served in several cabinets. Its membership comprised members of the old Parindra that had decided not to join the PNI Initially it had seven members in the Provisional People's Representative Council, although party faction leader Lobo subsequently defected to another party, Permai.

The three pillars of the party were patriotism, populism and social justice. Its aims were to strengthen the position of the Indonesian state and people, to bring about a democratic unitary state, to strive for a socialist society and to promote national culture. Among its priorities were the inclusion of West Papua within Indonesia, the implementation of a unitary, not federal, state and the holding of general elections as soon as possible.

The party contested the 1955 legislative election, but despite party members having held important roles in Indonesian cabinets, its share of the vote was so small that it failed to win any seats in the legislature.

Notes

References

 
 
 
 

 
 
 

Defunct political parties in Indonesia
Political parties established in 1935
Political parties disestablished in 1942
1935 establishments in the Dutch East Indies
1942 disestablishments in the Dutch East Indies
Political parties established in 1949
1949 establishments in Indonesia